Ruffolo is a surname of Italian origin. Notable people with the surname are as follows:

Edoardo Ruffolo (born 1991), Italian rugby union player
Giorgio Ruffolo (1926–2023), Italian economist, journalist and politician
Robert R. Ruffolo Jr. (born 1950), American pharmacologist 

Surnames of Italian origin